Iran Aseman Airlines serves the following scheduled destinations as of January 2016:

Destinations

References

Iran Aseman Airlines